is a railway station located in the city of Kakamigahara, Gifu Prefecture, Japan, operated by the private railway operator Meitetsu. This station and JR Central Unuma Station are connected with a passageway.

Lines
The station also offers express service to Chubu Centrair International Airport, using Meitetsu 2000 series trains on the Meitetsu μSky service.

Station layout
Shin-Unuma Station has two island platforms and one side platform connected by a footbridge. The station is staffed.

Platforms

Adjacent stations

|-
!colspan=5|Nagoya Railroad

History
Shin-Unuma Station opened on 1 October 1926.

Surrounding area
Kiso River
Unuma Station

See also
 List of Railway Stations in Japan

External links

  

Railway stations in Japan opened in 1926
Stations of Nagoya Railroad
Railway stations in Gifu Prefecture